Austrosassia parkinsonia is a species of predatory sea snail, a marine gastropod mollusk in the family Cymatiidae.

References

External links
 Perry G. (1811). Conchology, or the natural history of shells: containing a new arrangement of the genera and species, illustrated by coloured engravings executed from the natural specimens, and including the latest discoveries. 4 pp., 61 plates. London
 Strong E.E., Puillandre N., Beu A.G., Castelin M. & Bouchet P. (2019). Frogs and tuns and tritons – A molecular phylogeny and revised family classification of the predatory gastropod superfamily Tonnoidea (Caenogastropoda). Molecular Phylogenetics and Evolution. 130: 18-34

Cymatiidae